Rick Suder Jr. is an American college basketball player who played for Duquesne of the Atlantic 10 Conference (A10) from 1982 to 1986. Suder was a 2-time All-A10 selection and an All-American honorable mention.  He holds the Duquesne all-time single-season and career free throw percentage records as well as the all-time A10 career free throw percentage record. He led the A10 in scoring and free throw percentage for the 1985–86 season. He is the grandson of Major League Baseball infielder Pete Suder.

Early life
Suder is from Center Township, Beaver County, Pennsylvania, and he attended Center High School before matriculating to Duquesne. According to the Beaver County, Sports Hall of Fame, he was an All-Area (Pittsburgh) first team selection by both the  Pittsburgh Post-Gazette and the Pittsburgh Press. The Beaver County Times noted that he was a 2017 inductee into the Pittsburgh Basketball Club Hall of Fame.

College career
Suder's first 30-point game occured when he scored 30 points in the opening round of the 1985 Atlantic 10 men's basketball tournament against  on March 6, 1985. He later scored 34 points against  on January 11, 1986. Suder's 1985–86 (135–147=91.8%) and 1984–85 (139–157=88.5%) single-season free throw percentages rank first and second in Duquesne basketball history. He led Duquesne in scoring as a junior and in both steals and scoring as a senior.

He was a 1986 NCAA Men's Basketball All-American honorable mention selection by the Associated Press, after being among the 1985–86 NCAA Division I statistical leaders. According to the A10 2019–20 Media Guide records, Suder is the A10 career free throw percentage leader (342–390 87.69%, 1983–86, min 2.5 FT/game). Suder's career percentage was listed among the top 25 in the NCAA Division I record book until the 2006 edition. In the 2007 edition J. J. Redick (662–726=91.2%) and Gerry McNamara (435–490=88.8%) bumped him from the list. Suder was a 1985 second team All-A10 selection when his 17.7 points per game was third in the conference. The following year, he was a first team selection when his 20.5 scoring average and 91.8% free throw percentage both led the conference. The 91.8% ranked second among A10 single-season free throw percentages but fell to fourth by the time of the A10 2019–20 Media Guide. Although Duquesne was eliminated in the semi-finals, Suder was a member of the All-tournament team for the 1986 Atlantic 10 men's basketball tournament.

Later career
Suder became a professional investment advisor. In 2009, he was a named defendant in Predrag Danilović's federal complaint in Danilovic v. Worldwide Associates, LLC et al, which was filed February 9, 2009, and was also sued by Dejan Bodiroga and Zeljko Rebraca on April 9. All three litigants were 1990s NBA Draftees from Serbia, with two having National Basketball Association playing experience. Both suits were for investment fraud. Suder claimed that poor investment results were a result of the 2007–2008 financial crisis.

Personal life
Suder is the grandson of Pete Suder who was a Major League Baseball infielder for the Philadelphia / Kansas City Athletics. His son Peter, was a Carmel High School Class of 2022 signee for the Bellarmine Knights men's basketball.

See also
1986 NCAA Men's Basketball All-Americans
Duquesne Dukes men's basketball statistical leaders

Notes

External links
college stats at Sports Reference

1960s births
Living people
American men's basketball players
Basketball players from Pennsylvania
Duquesne Dukes men's basketball players
Sportspeople from the Pittsburgh metropolitan area